The 2022–23 Basketball Champions League is the 7th season of the Basketball Champions League (BCL), the premier European professional basketball competition for clubs launched by FIBA.

Team allocation 
A total of 52 teams from 29 countries will participate in the 2022–23 Basketball Champions League. 18 of them were domestic champions in the previous season.

Teams 
League positions after eventual playoffs of the previous season shown in parentheses. The Basketball Champions League rankings are taken into consideration.
 TH: Champions League title holders
 FEC: FIBA Europe Cup champions.
 WC: Wild card.

Referees
A total of 60 officials set to work on the 2022–23 season in Basketball Champions League:

Schedule 
The schedule of the competition will be as follows.

Qualifying rounds

Draw
The 24 teams will be divided into six pots based firstly on the competition's club ranking and, for clubs that have not yet participated in the competition, on the country ranking. For the quarterfinals round of qualifications, teams from Pot 6 will be drawn against teams from Pot 3, and teams from Pot 4 will face teams from Pot 5. Clubs from Pot 1 and 2 will be seeded, and will enter directly in the semifinals stage of qualifications and will face the winners from the quarterfinals round. The winners of the semifinals stage will face each other in the finals of qualifications. The four winners of the finals will then qualify for the regular season and join the 28 directly qualified teams in the main draw. The rest of the teams will be demoted, if they apply, to the FIBA Europe Cup.

Notes

 Indicates teams with no club points, therefore using the country points as a tiebreaker.

Qualification Group A (Skopje, North Macedonia)

Qualification Group B (Málaga, Spain)

Qualification Group C (Lisbon, Portugal)

Qualification Group D (Belgrade, Serbia)

Regular season

Draw
The 28 teams that entered in the regular season directly were divided into four pots based firstly on the club ranking and, for clubs that have not yet participated in the competition, on the country ranking. The country protection rule will apply for the stage of the draw. Clubs cannot be drawn in groups with other clubs from the same country.

Notes

 Indicates teams with no club points, therefor using the country points as a tiebreaker.

Group A

Group B

Group C

Group D

Group E

Group F

Group G

Group H

Play-ins
The Play-ins took place from January 3 to 18. The teams classified in second and third place in their respective groups of Basketball Champions League, went to the Play-ins. Winners advanced to the round of 16. The first legs were played on 3–4 January, the second legs on 10–11 January. Eventual third legs was played on 17–18 January.

|}

Round of 16 
The Round of 16 will take place from January 24 until March 22, 2023. The groups will be formed by the winners of each Regular Season Group and by eight Play-Ins winners. The 16 teams were divided in 4 groups, 4 teams each. The first two of each groups advanced to the quarter-finals.

Group I

Group J

Group K

Group L

Individual awards

MVP of the Month

See also 
2022–23 EuroLeague
2022–23 EuroCup Basketball
2022–23 FIBA Europe Cup

References

External links 
Official website

2022–23 Basketball Champions League
 
Basketball Champions League
Current basketball seasons